A lightning rod is a metal rod mounted on a structure and intended to protect the structure from a lightning strike.

Lightning Rods may refer to:

Lightning Rod (roller coaster), a roller coaster located at Dollywood theme park in Pigeon Forge, Tennessee
The Lightning Rods, an alternative name for the comics characters Great Lakes Avengers
Lightning Rods (novel), a novel by Helen DeWitt